The Ministry of Finance of Afghanistan is responsible for the implementation and execution of the budget, collection of taxes, organization, and control of public expenses in Afghanistan; it also controls the management of the Custom Affairs. The Ministry of Finance provides a quarterly report to inform the public and the executive cabinet of advancements in Afghanistan's financial sector.

History
The importance of taxes was first given a significant role under the rule of Ahmad Shah Baba. “In 1140, a number of governmental departments and offices were established, including the Ministry of Finance of Afghanistan, which was named Humayon Alla.”    The first minister was Abdullah Khan Popalzai. His successor Mustafawi Almalik improved the national economic system and monitoring of financial accounting in Afghanistan. Under king Habibullah Khan the tax base was small and the majority of Afghans did not accept the system in place. After achieving independence and reform of administrative military organization, the new Ministry of Finance was established. “Later, in 1965 the financial systems were developed and officially introduced in Afghanistan.”  According to the requirements and needs of Afghan financial system the ministry of Finance has following structure: Ministry, Deputy Administrative, Financial Deputy, Deputy Revenue and Customs, and Deputy Policy.  The Ministry of Finance has 12 departments and each department has certain responsibilities to lead and manage.

Responsibilities
International donors financially support the main portion of the Afghan governmental budget. As the Ministry of Finance is responsible for public finance and budget expenses throughout the country, it encourages international donors to provide direct budget aid in order to strengthen the position and credibility of the Ministry of Finance. According to the Afghanistan National Development Strategy the target sectors in 1390 (2011) were the security sector, the education sector and the governance sector. The goal of the strategy is reduce poverty, accelerate economic growth and improve security and governance. In 1391 (2012), budget AFS 18,838 million was allocated to security sector, for Education sector 5.533 million and for governance sector 2,531 million were allocated.

The total development budget for fiscal year 1390 (2011) was Afs 74 billion - which is equal to US$1.4 billion - and it increased to Afs 101.2 billion equal to US$1.9 billion in 1391  Whereas in 1391 the total development grants reached to 14.2 billion which increased by 49.5 percent throughout the year.  The Ministry of Finance tries to adjust its financial systems and financial activities according to international rules and regulations.  In order to accomplish these targets, the Ministry of Finance created new units, which include staff enrollment parts, policy design, and budget execution.  The main goal of Ministry of Finance is control the financial affairs of the country in order to have an economically more powerful country and make sure that public wealth is improved.

Ministers of Finance

In the Kingdom of Afghanistan
Muhammad Ayyub, 1929-1933
Mirza Muhammad Yaftali, 1933-1945
Muhammad Nauruz, 1945-1946
Mir Muhammad Haidar Husaini, 1946-1950
Muhammad Nauruz, 1950-1952
Ghulam Yahya Tarzi, 1952-1954
Abdul Malik Abdul-Rahimzay, 1954-1957
Abdullah Malikyar, 1957-1963
Sayyid Qasim Rishtiya, 1963-1965
Abdullah Yaftali, November 1965 - January 1967
Abdul Karim Hakimi, January 1967 - November 1967
Muhammad Anwar Ziyai, November 1967 - November 1969
Mohammad Aman, November 1969 - June 1971
Ghulam Haidar Dawar, June 1971 - December 1972
Muhammad Khan Jalalar, December 1972 - July 1973

In the Republic of Afghanistan
Sayyid Abdulillah, August 1973 - 1973
Mohammad Hasan Sharq, November 1975 - 1976 - ?
Sayyid Abdullah, March 1977 - April 1978, VP appointment 19 Feb 1978, killed 29 April 1978.

In the Democratic Republic of Afghanistan
Saleh Mohammad Zirai, April 1978 - May 1978
Abdul Karim Misaq, May 1978 - April 1979 - ?
Mohammad Abdul Wakil, December 1979 - 1984
Mohammad Kabir, July 1984 - June 1988
Hamidullah Tarzi, June 1988 - May 1990
Muhammad Hakim, May 1990 - 1991

In the Islamic State of Afghanistan
Hamidullah Rahimi, 1992 - ?
Karim Khalili, ? - 1993 - 1996
Abdul Hadi Arghandiwal, July 1996 – September 1996

In the Islamic Emirate of Afghanistan
Mohammad Ahmadi, ? - 1999 - ?
Agha Jan Motasim, ? - 1999 - ?
Muhammad Taher Anwari, ? - 2000 - ?

In the Islamic Republic of Afghanistan
Hedayat Arsala, December 2001 - June 2002
Ashraf Ghani, June 2002 - December 2004
Anwar ul-Haq Ahady, December 2004 - February 2009
Omar Zakhilwal, February 2009 – February 2015
Eklil Ahmad Hakimi, February 2015 – March 2018
Mohammad Qayoumi, April 2018 – March 2020
Abdul Hadi Arghandiwal, March 2020 – January 2021
Khalid Painda, January 2021 - August 2021

In the Islamic Emirate of Afghanistan
Gul Agha Ishakzai, 24 August 2021 – present

See also
Afghan afghani
Da Afghanistan Bank

References

External links
 The Afghanistan Ministry of Finance
 , Feb. 20, 2013, USAIDAfghanistan.

Finance
Afghanistan